Senator Slack may refer to:

James R. Slack (1818–1881), Indiana State Senate
Leighton P. Slack (1867–1938), Vermont State Senate
Lemuel Ertus Slack (1874–1952), Indiana State Senate